The Zimbabwe cricket team toured Bangladesh in January 2005 to play two Test matches and five One Day International matches. Bangladesh won the test series 1–0 with one match drawn.  This was the first time Bangladesh had won both a Test match and a Test series. They also hold the ODI series by 3-2 margin.

Schedule

Squads

Test series

1st Test

2nd Test

ODI series

1st ODI

2nd ODI

3rd ODI

4th ODI

5th ODI

References

 Playfair Cricket Annual (annual)
 Wisden Cricketers Almanack (annual)

External links
 CricketArchive itinerary
 

2005 in Bangladeshi cricket
International cricket competitions in 2004–05
2004-05
Bangladeshi cricket seasons from 2000–01
2005 in Zimbabwean cricket